Voinea is a frequent surname in Romania. It may refer to:

Adrian Voinea, tennis player
Albert Voinea, soccer player
Camelia Voinea, gymnast
Florea Voinea, soccer player
Maricel Voinea, team handball player
Şerban Voinea, socialist politician and theorist
Sorin Voinea, musician

See also
 Voina (disambiguation)
 Voicu
 Voineasa (disambiguation)
 Voinești (disambiguation)

Romanian-language surnames